Cyril Walker (September 18, 1892 – August 6, 1948) was an English professional golfer born in Manchester who emigrated to the United States in 1914.

Walker won the 1924 U.S. Open at Oakland Hills Country Club, while playing out of Englewood Golf Club in New Jersey. He beat defending champion Bobby Jones by three strokes. This was his only top ten finish in seven appearances at the U.S. Open. He was a small man, weighing only .

Walker won six PGA events between 1917 and 1930. He also won the Indiana Open in 1916.

In 1928, he became the pro at the Saddle River Golf and Country Club in Paramus, New Jersey.

Career demise
Walker's slow pace of play, combined with his sometimes-combative personality, eventually made him unpopular with fellow players and tournament sponsors.  This hastened his exit from the then-nascent professional golfers' tournament circuit. While a club pro at Saddle River in 1933, he was arrested for destroying the signs of a neighboring course. 

An alcohol addiction further hastened his downward spiral during the 1930s and he ultimately found himself in a near-destitute condition working as a caddie in Florida at the Miami Beach municipal course in 1940, and later as a dishwasher.

Walker died of pleural pneumonia in a Hackensack, New Jersey jail cell where he had gone for shelter.

Professional wins

PGA Tour wins (6)
1917 (1) one win
1921 (1) Pennsylvania Open Championship
1922 (1) one win
1923 (1) one win
1924 (1) U.S. Open
1930 (1) Miami International Four-Ball (with Clarence Gamber)

Other wins
1916 Indiana Open

Major championships

Wins (1)

Results timeline

NYF = Tournament not yet founded
NT = No tournament
CUT = missed the half-way cut
R64, R32, R16, QF, SF = Round in which player lost in PGA Championship match play
"T" indicates a tie for a place

See also
List of golfers with most PGA Tour wins

References

External links
Report on the 1924 U.S. Open on the tournament's official site
GolfCompendium.com – Cyril Walker

English male golfers
American male golfers
Winners of men's major golf championships
Golfers from New Jersey
Sportspeople from Manchester
British emigrants to the United States
Deaths from pneumonia in New Jersey
1892 births
1948 deaths